Meet Uncle Hussain, also spelled as MeetUncleHussain, is a progressive rock band from Malaysia. The band's major achievements include winning the prestigious Anugerah Juara Lagu in 2008.

Recognition
 Won the Pop/Rock Category at the 23rd Anugerah Juara Lagu
 Won the Best Song Award category at the 23rd Anugerah Juara Lagu
 Won the Best New Artist at the 16th Anugerah Industri Muzik

Current members
 Taja – Lead Guitar
 Gfat – Guitar Bass
 Babab – Guitar
 Pitt – Drum
 Hazama Azmi - Lead Vocal
 Bakri - Drum
 Kuddux - Drum

External links
 Meet Uncle Hussain on Myspace
 Meet Uncle Hussain from KAMI the Movie Soundtrack
 Meet Uncle Hussain at Channel [V]

Malaysian rock music groups
Musical groups established in 2001
Musical groups disestablished in 2014